Thérèse and Isabelle is a 1968 erotic drama film directed by Radley Metzger from a screenplay by Jesse Vogel, based on the 1966 novel Thérèse et Isabelle by Violette Leduc.

Plot
Two young girls grow up together and share affectionate intimacies in a Swiss boarding school for girls.

Cast
 Essy Persson as Thérèse
 Anna Gaël as Isabelle
 Barbara Laage as Thérèse's mother
 Anne Vernon as Mademoiselle Le Blanc
 Maurice Teynac as Monsieur Martin

Reception
Reviews of his film adaptation of Thérèse et Isabelle have been generally favorable, although not with all reviewers.

Notes
According to one film reviewer, Radley Metzger's films, including those made during the Golden Age of Porn (1969–1984), are noted for their "lavish design, witty screenplays, and a penchant for the unusual camera angle". Another reviewer noted that his films were "highly artistic—and often cerebral ... and often featured gorgeous cinematography". Film and audio works by Metzger have been added to the permanent collection of the Museum of Modern Art (MoMA) in New York City.

References

External links
 
 
 Therese and Isabelle at MUBI (related to The Criterion Collection)

1968 films
1968 drama films
1968 LGBT-related films
1960s English-language films
1960s erotic drama films
1960s French-language films
1960s teen drama films
American black-and-white films
American erotic drama films
American teen drama films
American teen LGBT-related films
Films set in boarding schools
Constantin Film films
Dutch black-and-white films
Dutch erotic drama films
Dutch LGBT-related films
Dutch teen films
English-language Dutch films
English-language French films
English-language German films
Films based on French novels
Films directed by Radley Metzger
Films scored by Georges Auric
Films set in Switzerland
Films shot in Brandenburg
Films shot in Paris
French black-and-white films
French erotic drama films
French LGBT-related films
French teen drama films
German black-and-white films
German erotic drama films
German LGBT-related films
German teen drama films
Juvenile sexuality in films
Lesbian-related films
LGBT-related drama films
West German films
1960s American films
1960s French films
1960s German films